Popeye and Son is an American animated comedy series based on the Popeye comic strip created by E.C. Segar and published by King Features Syndicate. Jointly produced by Hanna-Barbera and King Features subsidiary King Features Entertainment, the series aired for one season of thirteen episodes on CBS. It is a follow-up to The All New Popeye Hour. Maurice LaMarche performed the voice of Popeye in this series (succeeding Jack Mercer in that role), while much of the cast of The All New Popeye Hour reprised their respective roles, with the exception of Daws Butler. However, Nancy Cartwright, who was trained by Butler, voiced Woody in the series. It is also the first set of Popeye cartoons that were produced since Mercer's death in 1984. Following its original run on CBS, this series reran on the USA Network in the 1989–90 season and on The Family Channel from September 1994 to December 1995.

Overview 
Now married, Popeye and his longtime girlfriend Olive Oyl have a son named Popeye Jr. (or simply "Junior"), who has inherited Popeye's ability to gain superhuman strength from eating spinach; much to his father's disappointment, however, Junior hates the taste of spinach (instead, he prefers hamburgers, like Wimpy), although he eats spinach anyway should any trouble come his way. Popeye's longtime rival Bluto also has a wife, Lizzie, and a son, Tank. Like old times, Popeye and Bluto possess an intense mutual hatred, but Junior and Tank do not.

Voice cast 
 Susan Blu - Shelley (in "The Girl from Down Under")
 Steve Bulen -
 Nancy Cartwright - Woody
 Philip L. Clarke -
 Jeff Cohen - Francis Wimpy
 Barry Dennen -
 George DiCenzo -
 Richard Erdman -
 Ed Gilbert -
 Scott Grimes -
 Rebecca Gilchrist -
 Zale Kessler -
 Kaleena Kiff - Dee Dee
 Maurice LaMarche - Popeye, Poopdeck Pappy
 Allan Lurie -
 David Markus - Tank Bluto
 Allan Melvin - Bluto, J. Wellington Wimpy
 Scott Menville -
 Don Messick - Eugene the Jeep
 Howard Morris - Bandini the Genie
 Josh Rodine - Popeye Jr.
 Maggie Roswell - Jewelry Store Clerk
 Marilyn Schreffler - Olive Oyl, Lizzie Bluto, Puggy, The Sea Hag
 Penina Segall - Polly
 Carl Steven -
 Jeffrey Tambor -
 Rip Taylor -
 B.J. Ward - Rad
 Jimmy Weldon -
 Frank Welker - Shelley's Father (in "The Girl from Down Under")
 Patric Zimmerman -

List of episodes

Reception 
In 2014, including it in an article about twelve 1980s cartoons that supposedly did not deserve remembrance, io9 was largely critical of the series, noting that it did not utilize the conventions established by the theatrical Popeye short films.

Home media
In late 2008, Warner Home Video planned to release four Popeye and Son episodes (8 cartoons) on DVD (Volume One, released earlier in 2008, contained episodes of the previous Hanna-Barbera Popeye series, The All New Popeye Hour). As of 2021, the complete series as yet to come out on DVD.

References

External links 
 

1987 American television series debuts
1987 American television series endings
1980s American animated television series
Popeye the Sailor television series
Genies in television
Television series by Hanna-Barbera
CBS original programming
American children's animated comedy television series
Animated television series reboots